Mirzya is a 2016 Indian romantic fantasy film directed by Rakeysh Omprakash Mehra. Produced by Cinestaan Film Company and Mehra under his ROM Pictures, it stars Harshvardhan Kapoor and Saiyami Kher in lead roles along with Anuj Choudhry, Om Puri, Art Malik, K. K. Raina, and Anjali Patil in supporting roles. The basic premise of the film is inspired by the Punjabi folklore of Mirza Sahiban. 

Mirzya was released in India on 7 October 2016. The film received mixed critical reception and was a box office bomb, grossing 13.5 million against a budget of 45 million.

Plot
Mirzya tells the tale of a pair of lovebirds who were never meant to be together. Mohnish (Harshvardhan Kapoor) is a horse groomsman who reconnects with his childhood friend Suchitra (Saiyami Kher), a soon to be princess.

Mohnish and Suchitra are inseparable friends and classmates in high school in Jodhpur. One day, the schoolmaster canes Suchi for not doing her homework. Mohnish cannot bear the sight of her being hurt, and later shoots the teacher with a gun he stole from Suchi's father, a policeman. As a result, he is sent to a juvenile correction facility, and Suchitra's father sends her away to London for higher studies. Mohnish escapes the correction home.

Years later, Suchitra returns to India and is now getting engaged to Prince Karan. She wants to learn riding, and Karan instructs the stable-hand, Aadil, to teach her. Suchitra gets a feeling of deja vu and eventually discovers that Aadil is her childhood friend, Mohnish. The two of them kiss and reconcile.

They become inseparable again, and Suchi tells Aadil to confess to her father that he is ready to seek due punishment for the murder he committed in his childhood. However, when Aadil tries to tell Suchi's father that he wants to make amends for his wrongdoing and wishes to marry Suchi, her unforgiving father and Karan hatch a plot to get rid of him. Karan attempts to shoot him, and although injured, Aadil doesn't die.

Unable to find Aadil anymore, Suchi agrees to marry Karan. On the wedding day, Aadil's friend, a Muslim girl, comes to Suchi's rescue. She ensures Suchi and Aadil escape on his bike, and the lovers elope. They share a few moments of love and freedom on their desert ride. However, when the bike runs out of petrol, they are chased down by the police, Suchi's father, and Prince Karan. Aadil's friend slits her wrists and dies because she knows that if she gets caught, she will have to reveal her friends' whereabouts. Just as they reach the Rajasthan border, Aadil is shot; Suchi swallows poison and they die in one another's arms.

Cast
 Harshvardhan Kapoor as Mohnish/Aadil
 Saiyami Kher as Suchitra
 Anuj Choudhry as Karan
 Anjali Patil as Zeenat
 Art Malik as Suchitra's father
 K. K. Raina as Karan's father
 Om Puri

Soundtrack

The soundtrack was composed by Shankar–Ehsaan–Loy. There are 15 tracks in the album, including 6 short songs on the character of Mirzya, composed by Daler Mehndi, with all lyrics written by Gulzar.

Reception

Box office
The film grossed  during its first week run and performed poorly at the box office.

Critical reception
On review aggregator website Rotten Tomatoes, the film holds an approval rating of 55% based on 11 reviews, and an average rating of 5/10. On Metacritic, which assigns a normalized rating, the film has a score of 52 out of 100, based on 4 critics, indicating "mixed or average reviews".

Varietys Guy Lodge said, "Star-crossed lovers do as star-crossed lovers must in this bright, ambitious but incompletely conceived Bollywood spectacle." Meena Iyer of Times of India gave the film a 3/5 rating, praised the performance of leads Harshvardhan and Saiyami, and called the film "A broad, brash Bollywood romance, juggling Punjabi folklore with more contemporary Shakespearean allusions in its two-tiered narrative". The Economic Times gave the film 3.5/5 rating and stated, "Impressive performance by Harshvardhan Kapoor & Saiyami Kher, but a one-time watch."

Accolades

See also
 Mirza Sahiban

References

External links
 

2016 films
2010s romantic fantasy films
2010s Hindi-language films
Indian romantic fantasy films
Films scored by Shankar–Ehsaan–Loy
Films set in Rajasthan
Films based on Indian folklore
Films with screenplays by Gulzar
Films directed by Rakeysh Omprakash Mehra